James Francis "Dutch" Cain (February 1, 1902 – January 13, 1962) was a Canadian ice hockey defenceman who played two seasons in the National Hockey League for the Toronto St. Pats and Montreal Maroons between 1924 and 1926. The rest of his career, which lasted from 1924 to 1933, was spent in different minor leagues. He was born in Newmarket, Ontario. He was the cousin of Herb Cain.

Playing career
Cain played defence for the Montreal Maroons and the Toronto St. Pats. His NHL career was short-lived, consisting of only 61 regular season games. Cain ultimately found success in the International Hockey League winning two league championships as a member of the Buffalo Bisons. Cain's cousin, Herbert Cain also played in the National Hockey League.

Career statistics

Regular season and playoffs

External links
 

1902 births
1962 deaths
Buffalo Bisons (IHL) players
Canadian expatriate ice hockey players in the United States
Canadian ice hockey defencemen
Hamilton Tigers (CPHL) players
Ice hockey people from Ontario
Montreal Maroons players
Niagara Falls Cataracts players
Ontario Hockey Association Senior A League (1890–1979) players
Sportspeople from Newmarket, Ontario
St. Louis Flyers (AHA) players
Toronto Falcons (CPHL) players
Toronto St. Pats players
Tulsa Oilers (AHA) players